Rubi Rebelde is a 1989 Venezuelan telenovela produced by Radio Caracas Televisión based on the radionovelas La gata and Enamorada by Cuban author Inés Rodena. This version was written by Carlos Romero, Perla Farías, María Antonieta Gómez and Boris Izaguirre. This telenovela lasted 172 episodes and was distributed internationally by RCTV International.

Mariela Alcalá and Jaime Araque starred as the main protagonists with Joana Benedek, Adolfo Cubas as the main antagonists.

Synopsis
The slums held no apparent future for Rubi, a young girl abandoned and exploited. Victor lives on the other side of town from Rubi. A minor accident brings them together, sparking an instant attraction. Víctor's family is torn by secret ambitions and bitterness. His mother is an angry woman full of resentment. She battles a hostile relationship with Victor's paternal grandmother, who controls the family's wealth. Victor's brother, with his villainous ideas and evil notions, is much like his mother. His younger sister, the sweet Virginia, is blind. Victor is outstanding, both kind and warmhearted, and Rubi is induced by him to enter the family home. His concern is misinterpreted by Rubi as love for her. To make matters worse, Rubi is despised by Victor's mother. His grandmother, however, finds her charm and innocence touching. To avenge her spiteful daughter-in-law, the grandmother changes her will to name Rubi sole benefactor. Now potentially wealthy, Rubi is thrust into an unknown world, one in which she will again be compelled to fight to survive.

Cast

Mariela Alcala as Rubi
Jaime Araque as Víctor Alfonso Miranda
Ricardo Herranz as Francisco
Alejandro Delgado as Reynaldo Itturralde
Maria Teresa Acosta as Leonor Miranda
Haydee Balza as La China
Joana Benedek as Zoraida
Jose Daniel Bort as Tilico
Inés María Calero as Gladys
Yajaira Orta+Dalila Colombo as Lucrecia de Miranda
Adolfo Cubas as Nelson
Isabel Herrera as Macorina
Ileana Jacket as Carolina
Adelaida Mora as Virginia
Frank Moreno as Sabatino
René Muñoz as Padre Martin
Jorge Palacios as Leonardo
Carolina Perpetuo as Ana María
Rosario Prieto as Dorila
Victoria Roberts as Meche
Marcelo Romo as Felix
Carlota Sosa as Carmela
Vicente Tepedino as Fabián
Maria Bosco as Giustina(Hermina)
Alberto Marin as Emilio Castro

Remake
Nathalie Lartilleux remade Rubi Rebelde in 2014 along with the 1970 Mexican telenovela La Gata into a new telenovela called La Gata ,  and Maite Perroni and Daniel Arenas starred as the protagonists.

References

External links
Rubi Rebelde at the Internet Movie Database

1989 telenovelas
RCTV telenovelas
Venezuelan telenovelas
1989 Venezuelan television series debuts
1989 Venezuelan television series endings
Spanish-language telenovelas
Television shows set in Venezuela